The European Film Fund (EFF), also known as the European Relief Fund, was a non-profit organization established by the talent agent and producer Paul Kohner.

History 
The European Film Fund was founded on November 5, 1938 on the initiative of Paul Kohner, Ernst Lubitsch, and Universal Pictures studio head, Carl Laemmle. Founder members were William Dieterle, Bruno Frank, Felix Jackson, Salka Viertel and Ernst Lubitsch. The Domicile of the EFF was Paul Kohner Talent Agency and president was Ernst Lubitsch, because he was considered the best known European filmmaker in Hollywood. The organisation was founded to help European emigrants who needed Affidavits, money or jobs. That is why, Liesl Frank, Bruno Frank's wife, worked together with the Emergency Rescue Committee.

The Fund collected and distributed money, some filmmakers donated one percent of their fees. For example, Michael Curtiz and William Wyler, both Jewish and of, respectively, Hungarian and Swiss-German origin, were especially generous. Furthermore, there were earnings from benefit performances.

In the early 1940s the Fund earned about $40,000. Some Persons were supported by credits, others by donations. Several beneficiaries of the EFF got jobs in the film industry (esp. at Metro-Goldwyn-Mayer and Warner Bros.) as screenwriters.
These jobs weren't paid very well but they often were the precondition for getting visa. Many European filmmakers couldn't repay the money, because they didn't find well paid jobs.

"The more clear-headed émigrés understood very soon that these salaries paid them by Hollywood were fictitious, at least when the realized that, while they earned $100 or $200 a week for completely useless work, a real screen writer earned $3,500. It was quite symbolic that once their contracts expired[…]."
The Fund was closed in 1948.

List of benefit recipients 

 Heinrich Mann
 Leonhard Frank
 Alfred Döblin
 Wilhelm Speyer
 Hans G. Lustig
 Walter Mehring
 Bertolt Brecht
 Ludwig Marcuse
 Ernst Lothar

References

Further reading 
 Asper, Helmut G. "Etwas Besseres als den Tod-- " Filmexil in Hollywood: Porträts, Filme, Dokumente. Marburg: Schüren, 2002. p. 236–249.  
 Asper, Helmut G. Filmexilanten im Universal Studio: 1933-1960. Berlin: Bertz + Fischer, 2005.  
 Palmier, Jean-Michel. Weimar in Exile: The Antifascist Emigration in Europe and America. London: Verso, 2006.  

 Sauter, Martin. Liesl Frank, Charlotte Dieterle and the European Film Fund Coming Into Their Own - How Exile Changed The Traditional Role Assigned To Women. Berlin: epubli GmbH, 2012. Thesis (Ph.D.)--University of Warwick, 2010. Submitted for the degree of Doctor of Philosophy, Warwick University / German Department. Supervised by Professor Erica Carter. February 2010.

External links 
 https://web.archive.org/web/20080823065901/http://www.usc.edu/libraries/archives/arc/libraries/feuchtwanger/exiles/filmfund.html
 http://www.filmportal.de/df/31/Artikel,,,,,,,,1E818B26A8CA2E22E04053D50B37734C,,,,,,,,,,,,,,,,,,,,,,,,,,,.html

Film organizations